Mahbub (or Mahboob) Alam (1863-1933) was an Indian journalist and publisher who lived in Gujranwala. He was a pioneer in South Asian journalism, and in 1888 he founded the daily newspaper Paisa Akhbar (Penny Newspaper), which covered political and social news.

References

Indian male journalists
People from Gujranwala
Indian publishers (people)
1863 births
1933 deaths
19th-century Indian writers